River Bend Nature Center is a non-profit day-use nature center in the city of Faribault, Minnesota. It was established in the late 1970s as a 501 (c)(3) educational non-profit dedicated to helping people discover, enjoy, understand and preserve the natural world. The nature center encompasses  cradling the Straight River. The main Interpretive Center houses naturalist staff, displays, Windows on the Wild backyard bird habitat, and the Carlander Nature Library. The Trailside Center is a 3-season programming and maintenance facility. Five peripheral parcels of River Bend are owned by The Nature Conservancy.

Notable flora and fauna 
The center contains some specimens of the endangered dwarf trout lily.

Programming and staff 
The River Bend Nature Center staff conducts interpretive programs for adults and children throughout the year.  Children from public and several charter elementary schools in Rice County visit the center regularly as part of the science curriculum at those schools.  In addition, River Bend staff travel to schools and home-schooled students throughout Rice County to provide natural and environmental education in several off-site programs.

Location 
River Bend is located just off state highway 60 in the southeast corner of the city of Faribault in central Rice County.

References

External links 
 

Nature centers in Minnesota
Protected areas of Rice County, Minnesota
Buildings and structures in Faribault, Minnesota
Education in Rice County, Minnesota
Tourist attractions in Rice County, Minnesota